The Land of Harm and Appletrees is the debut studio album by Aurora Sutra, released on September 3, 1993 by Talitha Records.

Reception
Industrial Reviews awarded The Land of Harm and Appletrees four out of five stars and attributed the album's success to its use of sonic layering and acoustics as well as the vocal performances of Patricia Nigiani and Peter Spilles.

Track listing

Personnel 
Adapted from The Land of Harm and Appletrees liner notes.

Aurora
 Patricia Nigiani – vocals
 Peter Spilles – electronics, programming, production

Production and additional personnel
 Aurora – cover art, design
 Matthias Rewig – engineering

Release history

References

External links 
 
 The Land of Harm and Appletrees at iTunes

1993 debut albums
Aurora Sutra albums
Cleopatra Records albums